These are the Kowloon East results of the 2000 Hong Kong legislative election. The election was held on 10 September 2000 and all 4 seats in Kowloon East which consisted of Wong Tai Sin District and Kwun Tong District were contested. The Democratic Alliance for the Betterment of Hong Kong received more votes than the Democratic Party for the first time, with Chan Kam-lam getting elected.

Overall results
Before election:

Change in composition:

Candidates list

See also
Legislative Council of Hong Kong
Hong Kong legislative elections
2000 Hong Kong legislative election

References

2000 Hong Kong legislative election